This is a list of ski areas and resorts in South America.

Argentina
 Los Penitentes, Las Cuevas (Mendoza Province).
 Los Puquios, Puente del Inca, Departamento Las Heras (Mendoza Province).
 Las Leñas, Malargüe (Mendoza Province).
 El Azufre, Malargüe (Mendoza Province).
 Vallecitos, Luján de Cuyo (Mendoza Province).
 Caviahue, Caviahue-Copahue (Neuquén Province).
 Primeros Pinos, Picunches (Neuquén Province).
 Batea Mahuida, Villa Pehuenia  (Neuquén Province)
 Cerro Wayle, Chos Malal  (Neuquén Province)
 Chapelco, San Martín de los Andes (Neuquén Province).
 Cerro Bayo, Villa La Angostura (Neuquén Province).
 Lago Hermoso Ski & Resort (Neuquén Province)
 Cerro Catedral, Bariloche (Río Negro Province).
 Cerro Otto, Bariloche (Río Negro Province).
 Cerro Perito Moreno, El Bolsón (Río Negro Province).
 La Hoya, Esquel (Chubut Province).
 Valdelen, Río Turbio (Santa Cruz Province).
 Centro de Esquí El Calafate, El Calafate (Santa Cruz Province).
 Calafate Mountain Park, El Calafate (Santa Cruz Province).
 Glaciar Martial, Ushuaia (Tierra del Fuego Province).
 Cerro Castor, Ushuaia (Tierra del Fuego Province).

Bolivia
Chacaltaya (occasionally operational)

Brazil 
Ski Mountain Park (artificial)
 Snowland Gramado (indoor)

Chile

Valparaíso Region

Portillo, Los Andes
Ski Arpa, Los Andes

Metropolitan Region

El Colorado, Santiago
Farellones, Santiago
La Parva, Santiago
Lagunillas, San José de Maipo
Valle Nevado, Santiago

O'Higgins Region

Chapa Verde, Rancagua

Bío-Bío Region

Nevados de Chillán, Chillán
Volcán Antuco, Los Ángeles

Araucanía Region

Corralco, Curacautín
Las Araucarias, Temuco
Los Arenales, Lonquimay (closed)
Ski Pucón, Villarrica

Los Ríos Region

Bosque Nevado, Huilo-Huilo (Permanently closed)

Los Lagos Region

Antillanca, Osorno
Volcán Osorno, Puerto Varas

Aysén Region

El Fraile, Coyhaique

Magallanes Region

Cerro Mirador, Punta Arenas

Venezuela
Pico Espejo (defunct)

References

South America
South America-related lists
Skiing in South America
South America sport-related lists
Lists of buildings and structures in South America